Aedh mac Tairdelbach Óg Ó Conchobair (died 15 May 1461), was one of the sons of Toirdhealbhach Óg Donn Ó Conchobair and King of Connacht from 1439–1461. Aedh Ó Conchobair succeeded to the throne of the Connachta in 1439 after the death of Cathal mac Ruaidri Ó Conchobair and was succeeded by Fedlim Ó Conchobair, also a son of Toirdhealbhach Óg Donn Ó Conchobair.

References

 Byrne, Francis John (2001), Irish Kings and High-Kings, Dublin: Four Courts Press, 
 Gaelic and Gaelised Ireland, Kenneth Nicols, 1972.

1461 deaths
People from County Roscommon
15th-century Irish monarchs
O'Conor dynasty
Year of birth unknown